Latex is an aqueous dispersion of polymers that can be solidified into rubber.

Latex may also refer to:

Materials
 Natural rubber, the commercial product made from plants that naturally produce polyisoprene latex
 Latex clothing, made from latex rubber
 Synthetic latex or synthetic rubber

Other uses
 LaTeX, a document preparation system and markup language
 Latex, Texas, US